Collix olivia is a moth in the  family Geometridae. It is found on Fiji.

References

Moths described in 1975
olivia